Bodjiho Rosvitha Okou (born 5 September 1986, Gagnoa, Côte d'Ivoire) is an Ivorian hurdler. At the 2012 Summer Olympics, she competed in the Women's 100 metres hurdles without reaching the semifinals. In addition, she won a silver medal at the 2014 African Championships. Until 2012 she represented France.

Her personal bests are 13.13 seconds in the 100 metres hurdles (+0.1 m/s, La Roche-sur-Yon 2011) and 8.17 seconds in the 60 metres hurdles (Mondeville 2014). Both are current national records.

International competitions

References

External links
 

1986 births
Living people
People from Gagnoa
Ivorian female hurdlers
Olympic athletes of Ivory Coast
Athletes (track and field) at the 2012 Summer Olympics
Athletes (track and field) at the 2015 African Games
Athletes (track and field) at the 2019 African Games
African Games medalists in athletics (track and field)
African Games bronze medalists for Ivory Coast